Self Publish, Be Happy (SPBH) is an organisation founded by Bruno Ceschel in 2010 that aims to help aspiring photographers to self-publish their own books. It does so through workshops, talks, exhibitions, live events, on/offline projects and publicising of books. It is based on Ridley Road, in Dalston, London, where it keeps a library of some 2000 donated self-published zines and books.

Since 2012 Self Publish, Be Happy has also published photography books as SPBH Editions. Ceschel is its director and Antonio de Luca its art director. It has published books by Broomberg & Chanarin, Cristina de Middel, Mariah Robertson, Lorenzo Vitturi and others.

SPBH produces various series of publications—SPBH Book Club, which are sold as part of a yearly subscription as well as sold separately; SPBH Pamphlets, pamphlets with photography and text, including one by Anouk Kruithof; and Self Publish Be Naughty (SPBN), books of intimate pictures of people by their romantic partners.

In November 2015 Ceshel's book Self Publish, Be Happy: A DIY Photobook Manual and Manifesto was published by Aperture.

Reception
Parr and Badger include Self Publish Be Naughty (2011) in the third volume of their photobook history.

Critic Sean O'Hagan, writing in The Guardian, said "An accurate measure of SPBH’s importance to the contemporary cottage industry is the array of photobooks they have featured that I would cite as contemporary classics."

Publications (selected)
Self Publish Be Naughty. London: Self Publish, Be Happy, 2011. . 122 photographs from 75 photographers, and text. Edition of 1000 copies.
AB&OC. SPBH Book Club Vol. I. By Adam Broomberg & Oliver Chanarin. London: Self Publish, Be Happy, 2012. . Edition of 250 copies.
SPBH Book Club Vol. II. By Brad Feuerhelm. London: Self Publish, Be Happy, 2012. Edition of 250 copies.
SPBH Book Club Vol. III. By Cristina de Middel. London: Self Publish, Be Happy, 2013. . Edition of 500 copies.
SPBH Book Club Vol. IV. By Mariah Robertson. London: Self Publish, Be Happy, 2013. . Edition of 500 copies.
Dalston Anatomy. By Lorenzo Vitturi.
London: Self Publish, Be Happy, 2013. . Edition of 700 copies.
London: Self Publish, Be Happy, 2014. Edition of 1000 copies.
SPBH Book Club Vol. V. By Esther Teichmann. London: Self Publish, Be Happy, 2014. . Edition of 500 copies.
SPBH Book Club Vol. VI. By Melinda Gibson. London: Self Publish, Be Happy, 2014. Edition of 300 copies.
SPBH Book Club Vol. VII. By Lucas Blalock. London: Self Publish, Be Happy, 2014. . Edition of 300 copies.

Events
2010: Self Publish, Be Happy Weekend, Photographers' Gallery, London, 5–6 June 2010.
2013: Compilation Tokyo, Tokyo, 6–7 April 2013. A SPBH Live event where artists produced a publication live in front of an audience. This event produced Compilation Tokyo (2013) with Itami, Koji Kitagawa, Taisuke Koyama, Shinryo Saeki, Masafumi Shirakami, Hirosh Takagi, Hiroshi Takizawa, Nerhol, Kenji Hirasawa, Daisuke Yokota and Anne Schwalbe.
2015: Jimmy Limit with Self Publish, Be Happy, Scotiabank Contact Photography Festival, Toronto, Canada, 2 May 2015.
2015: Offprint London, Tate Modern, London, 22–25 May 2015.
2015: Business as Usual: Self Publish, Be Happy in Residence, Photographers' Gallery, London, 20–27 November 2015. The SPBH office set up in the gallery, plus daily events.

Awards
Awards received for Self Publish, Be Happy publications:
2016: Fire in Cairo (2015) by Matthew Connors won Artist's Book award, Infinity Awards, International Center of Photography, New York, NY

See also
List of self-publishing companies
Small press

References

External links

Interview with Bruno Ceschel at Photomonitor.
Studio Visit: Self Publish Be Happy by Patricia Karallis at Paper Journal.

Visual arts publishing companies
Book publishing companies based in London
Small press publishing companies
Photographic collections and books
Photography companies of the United Kingdom
Companies based in the London Borough of Hackney
2010 establishments in England
Publishing companies established in 2012
Self-publishing companies